Gerry Sinnott (born 31 July 1951) is an Irish equestrian. He competed in two events at the 1976 Summer Olympics.

References

1951 births
Living people
Irish male equestrians
Olympic equestrians of Ireland
Equestrians at the 1976 Summer Olympics
Place of birth missing (living people)